This is a list of Imperial Japanese Navy bases and facilities

Bases
 Atsugi Naval Air Base - now Naval Air Facility Atsugi operated by the Japan Maritime Self-Defense Force (JMSDF) and the US Navy
 Kure Naval Base - now a Japan Self-Defense Forces facility and museum
 Maizuru Naval Base
 Maizuru Naval District - now a Japan Self-Defense Forces facility and museum
 Hiroshima Naval Base
 Oroku Aerodrome/Oroku Naval Air Base - now the Naha Airport/Naha Air Base (JSADF, but the MSDF also has a presence)
 Kōchi Airfield - now Kōchi Ryōma Airport
Truk Islands naval base

Dockyards
 Yokosuka Dockyards - now US Navy Yokosuka Ship Repair Facility and United States Fleet Activities Yokosuka
 Ishikawajima Naval Yard (Sumida River) - now IHI Corporation shipyard
 Kure Naval Dockyards - now Universal Shipbuilding Corporation shipyard owned by JFE Holdings and Hitachi Zosen Corporation
 Sasebo Naval Dockyards
 Maizuru Naval Dockyards

Colleges and Training Facilities
 Nagasaki Training Station
 Tsukiji Naval College, Yedo
 Tsukiji Naval College
 Tokyo Naval Cadet Academy

Meteorological Stations and other Support Facilities
 Minami-Tori-shima - meteorological station with co-located airstrip (now Minami Torishima Airport, a MSDF run facility)
 Chichi jima naval base - Communications and Supply base. The island was the site of the primary long range transmitters used by the IJN and IJA to maintain contact with their far flung forces in World War II. Co-located with a seaplane base. Both are now MSDF facilities.
 Hiratsuka Naval Ammunitions Arsenal (平塚海軍火薬廠 Hiratsuka Kaigun Kayaku Shō?)
 Kamiseya torpedo assembly plant - Nowadays the site of Naval Support Facility Kamiseya, formerly Kamiseya Naval Radio Receiving Facility (US Navy)

Other
This is a list of facilities outside Japan and under Japanese control:
Piso Point, Eastern portion of Davao Gulf, Philippines
 Takeshiki (in Tsushima)
 Mekong (Pescadores)
 Ominato
 Alicante Naval Air Base, Negros, Visayas
 Amboina Naval Air Base
 Anibong Point Leyte
 Bacolod, Negros, Visayas
 Ballale, Fauro Island, Solomon Islands
 Bonis, Bougainville, Solomon Islands
 Brunei Bay, Brunei, North Borneo
 Buka Island, Solomon Islands
 Gasmata
 Kahili, Bougainville
 Kanoya
 Kara, Bougainville, Solomon Islands
 Kavieng
 Kendari
 Lae Lae
 Lahug, Cebu, Philippines
 Madang, New Guinea
 Munda, New Georgia, Solomon Islands
 Rabaul Naval Base
 Singapore Naval Base and Airfield, Malaya Singapore
 Palembang Airfield
 Peleliu Airfield, Palau Islands
 Penang submarine base, Malaya 
 Saigon Airfield
 San Jose Airfield
 Saravia Airfield, Negros, Visayas
 Thudaumot Airfield
 Tuluvu Airfield, New Britain, Bismarck Archipelago
 Vila Airfield, Kolombangara, Solomon Islands
 Wewak Airfield, New Guinea, South West Pacific
 Camranh Bay Naval Anchorage, Indo China
 Faisi Naval Anchorage, Shortland Islands
 Lingga Roads Naval Anchorage, Malacca Strait
 Mako Naval Anchorage, Pescadores
 Samah Harbour, Naval Anchorage, Hainan Island, South East Asia
 Tawi-Tawi Naval Anchorage, Sulu
 Tonolei Naval Anchorage, Bougainville
 Palau Islands Naval Base
 Saipan Naval Base, Mariana Islands
Kwajalein Atoll Naval Base (Submarine), Marshall Islands
 Taiwan Naval Base
 Buka Island Seaplane Base, Solomon Islands
 Rekata Bay Seaplane Base, Santa Isabel Island 
 Shortland Islands Seaplane Base
 Tulagi Seaplane Base, Solomon Islands

See also
Imperial Japanese Navy Land Forces
Notoro class oiler
Japanese seaplane carrier Nisshin
Tokai Maru
Type J1 submarine
Type D submarine
Ha-101 class submarine

Imperial Japanese Navy
Empire of Japan
Naval installations